The 2013–14 season was AS Monaco FC's first season back in Ligue 1 since relegation from Ligue 1 in 2011. They finished the season in second place, reached the semi-finals of the Coupe de France and the Third round of the Coupe de la Ligue.

Season review

Monaco started the season with –2 points following crowd troubles at the end of the 2012–13 season.

Billionaire owner Dmitry Rybolovlev backed an incredible spending spree that saw the club spend close to €150 million in the summer transfer window, including around €50 million on Radamel Falcao. The spending spree meant that expectations were high for the club despite participating in Ligue 2 the season prior. The Monegasque had a great season in Ligue 1, finishing in second place behind Paris Saint-Germain. The second place meant the side qualified for the 2014–15 UEFA Champions League group stage after an extended absence from the competition.

Squad

Out on loan

Transfers

Summer

In:

Out:

Winter

In:

Out:

Competitions

Friendlies

Ligue 1

League table

Results summary

Results by round

Matches

Coupe de la Ligue

Coupe de France

Squad statistics

Appearances and goals

|-
|colspan="14"|Players away from the club on loan:

                       
|-
|colspan="14"|Players who appeared for Monaco no longer at the club:

|}

Top scorers

Disciplinary record

References

AS Monaco FC seasons
Monaco
AS Monaco
AS Monaco